Daniel Hale (died September 2, 1821) was an American Federalist politician.

Life
After the American Revolutionary War, he settled in Albany, New York, and became a merchant.

About 1783, he married Catharina Dyckman, and they had several children.

He was Secretary of State of New York from 1798 to 1801, and from 1810 to 1811.

Hale died in Albany on September 2, 1821.

References

Sources
Daniel Hale at New York State Museum
Daniel Hale at The Political Graveyard (gives wrong year for beginning of his first term as Secretary of State)

1821 deaths
Secretaries of State of New York (state)
Year of birth missing